N. Anil Kumar was a judge of the Kerala High Court. The  High Court of Kerala  is the highest court in the Indian state of Kerala and in the Union Territory of Lakshadweep. The High Court of Kerala is headquartered at Ernakulam, Kochi.

Early life and education
Anil Kumar  was born on 03.12.1959. He has completed his graduation from N.S.S. College, Nilamel and obtained a law degree from Govt. Law College, Thiruvananthapuram.

Career
He enrolled as an Advocate in 1983 and started practicing in Thiruvananthapuram. In 1991 he joined Kerala Civil Judicial Service as Munsiff, served as Sub Judge from 2001 to 2004, appointed as the Chief Judicial Magistrate of Ernakulam District in 2004. In 2005 he was promoted as District and Sessions Judge. Thereafter, he served as Special Judge - CBI, Ernakulam, Judge, Motor Accident Claims Tribunal, Kollam, Additional District and Sessions Judge, Mavelikkara, Legal Advisor and Disciplinary Enquiry Officer, KSEB from 2010 to 2013, Principal District and Sessions Judge, Ernakulam, Registrar General, High Court of Kerala from where he was elevated  as Additional Judge of High Court of Kerala on 05.11.2018. Justice Anilkumar demitted his office upon attaining age of superannuation on 02 December 2021. Recently, the state government reorganised the Kerala Anti-Social Activities (Prevention) Act (KAAPA) advisory board and appointed Justice N Anil Kumar as its new chairman on 18th February 2022.

References

Judges of the Kerala High Court
21st-century Indian judges
1959 births
Living people
Government Law College, Thiruvananthapuram alumni